"Give Me Something" is a song by Yoko Ono, originally released in 1980 on John Lennon and Ono's duet album Double Fantasy. The song appeared in Ono's off-Broadway musical New York Rock and her compilation albums Walking on Thin Ice and Onobox. In 2010, the Junior Boys remix of the song was released as a free download on MySpace Music and RCRD LBL.

Background
"Give Me Something" was written by Yoko Ono, while the music, like the rest of the songs on Double Fantasy, was produced by John Lennon, Ono, and Jack Douglas. Ono stated in an  interview that "Give Me Something" was written as "feeling that I had about society. [...] We’re all getting very cold now as a society." Ono further explained the song's theme of coldness to Spinner: "I remember I was envisioning a gray, cold city with people walking with hands in their pockets and putting the collars of their coats up."

Critical reception
Larry Fitzmaurice from Pitchfork Media described the original version as a "spiky new-wave tune featuring a particularly angry vocal performance," but commented that the Junior Boys "smooth out some of the tune's rougher edges, morphing Ono's cries into elastic bursts and turning the track into a Danceteria-worthy disco jam."

Chart performance
The song became Yoko Ono's fourth consecutive number-one hit on the Billboard Hot Dance Club chart.

Track listing
Digital download (Vocal Mixes)
 "Give Me Something" (Morel's I Gave You My Heart Mix) – 6:55
 "Give Me Something" (Dave Audé Club Mix) – 8:14
 "Give Me Something" (TWISTED Sound+Vision Club Mix) – 7:13
 "Give Me Something" (StoneBridge Club Mix) – 5:53
 "Give Me Something" (Ralphi's BIG Vocal) – 8:19
 "Give Me Something" (Roberto Rodriguez Extended Vocal Mix) – 10:06
 "Give Me Something" (Junior Boys Club Mix) – 4:52
 "Give Me Something" (Alex Trax Club Mix) – 7:02
 "Give Me Something" (Floppy Kid Original Re-edit) – 2:43
 "Give Me Something" (BONUS TRACK: Sparks Reinvention) – 4:19

Digital download (Dub Mixes)
 "Give Me Something" (Morel's I Gave You My Heart Dub) – 7:04
 "Give Me Something" (Dave Audé Dub Mix) – 6:45
 "Give Me Something" (Stonebridge Dub Mix) – 5:53
 "Give Me Something" (TWISTED Sound+Vision Dub) – 6:57
 "Give Me Something" (Ralphi's BIG Club Dub) – 8:14
 "Give Me Something" (Alex Trax Dub) – 6:34
 "Give Me Something" (Roberto Rodriguez Let's You Have It Mix) – 7:49
 "Give Me Something" (Roberto Rodriguez Instrumental Dub) – 7:53

Charts

Weekly charts

Year-end charts

See also
 List of number-one dance singles of 2010 (U.S.)

References 

Yoko Ono songs
1980 songs
2010 singles
Song recordings produced by Jack Douglas (record producer)
Song recordings produced by John Lennon
Song recordings produced by Yoko Ono
Songs written by Yoko Ono